Sidney D. Gamble (July 12, 1890 – 1968) was born in Cincinnati, Ohio, to David Berry and Mary Huggins Gamble; grandson of James Gamble, who, with William Procter, founded Procter & Gamble in 1837. in 1912 he graduated magna cum laude from Princeton University with a Bachelor of Literature degree and was elected to Phi Beta Kappa. He visited China for four extended periods, 1908, 1917–1919, 1924–27, and 1931–1932, doing Christian social work for YMCA and conducting social surveys. He is now best known for his remarkable and extensive photographs of Peking and North China.

At his death he left his widow, the former Elizabeth Lowe, four children, Catherine, Louise, David, and Anne, and ten grandchildren. His daughter, Catherine G. Curran, in 1986 established the Sidney D. Gamble Foundation, and the Sidney D. Gamble Lectures are given annually in Pasadena, California.

Social survey and photography in China

Gamble first toured in 1908, accompanying his parents, then after graduating from Princeton in 1912, studied labor and industrial economics at University of California, Berkeley, spending six months on a fellowship working at a reform school for delinquent boys. At this time, he built the house which became known as the Sidney D. Gamble House.

In 1917, he joined the work of Princeton-in-Peking and Peking YMCA where his Princeton friend John Stewart Burgess invited him to do the surveys which resulted in Peking: A Social Survey, which included more than fifty photographs. In 1919 Gamble was on hand to capture dramatic photographs of the May Fourth student demonstrations. The motto of the May Fourth Movement, "To save China through science and democracy," and the missionary ideal of "Saving China through Christianity" for a time seemed to be united. When he returned with his bride, Elizabeth Lowe, to China in 1924, he used his family resources to hire a team of Chinese researchers to survey 283 families. The book was published in 1933 as How Chinese Families Live in Peiping (as Peking was then called). In 1926, Gamble traveled for three weeks in the Soviet Union with Sherwood Eddy,  a longtime mentor.

As China became more and more inflamed by patriotic agitation and warlord fighting, he found hope in the Ting Hsien Experiment (Ding Xian Experiment)in Rural Reconstruction conducted by James Yen’s Mass Education Movement. In 1931-32 Gamble traveled to China for the fourth and final time to organize the surveys which he used for three more detailed volumes, Ting Hsien: A North China Rural Community (1954) and North China Villages (1963). Chinese Village Plays, published in 1970, after his death, give translations based on unique transcriptions of now lost village yang ko plays, which differ from the later dances.

Jonathan Spence concludes of Gamble that his "findings were open-minded, clear headed, methodologically intelligent (though not always beyond criticism by scholars of different views), startlingly imaginative, and -- when presented in photographic form -- vigorous, ebullient, unsentimental, and starkly, yet never cruelly, illustrative of the deep and real suffering that lay at the heart of China's long revolution."

Later career

After his return to the United States, was elected member of the National Council of YMCA, became Treasurer, Vice Chairman, Chairman, and President Emeritus of Church World Service; Chairman of the Executive Committee of the Josiah Macy Jr. Foundation; President and Honorary Chairman of Princeton-in-Asia.

Notes

References and further reading

 
 Jonathan Spence, "Sidney Gamble's China," in Spence, Chinese Roundabout: Essays in History and Culture (Norton, 1992 ): 51–67.

Works

 Sidney D. Gamble,  with the assistance of John Stewart Burgess, [https://books.google.com/books?id=pG8uAAAAYAAJ Peking, a Social Survey Conducted under the Auspices of the Princeton University Center in China and the Peking Young Men's Christian Association]  (London: H. Milford,  1921). 538p. Foreword by G. Sherwood Eddy and Robert A. Woods.
 Sidney D. Gamble,  Ho-chên Wang, Jên-ho Liang, How Chinese Families Live in Peiping; a Study of the Income and Expenditure of 283 Chinese Families (New York, London: Funk & Wagnalls Company,  1933). 348 pp  33025920. Field work in charge of Wang Ho-ch*en and Liang Jen-ho.
 S. D. Gamble, "The Disappearance of Foot-Binding in Tinghsien," The American Journal of Sociology 49.2  (1943).
 Sidney D. Gamble, Foreword by Y.C. James Yen. Field work directed by Franklin Ching-han Lee. Ting Hsien, a North China Rural Community  (New York: International Secretariat Institute of Pacific Relations,  1954; rpr Stanford University Press, 1968). xxv, 472p.  54009009
 Sidney D. Gamble,North China Villages; Social, Political, and Economic Activities before 1933  (Berkeley: University of California Press,  1963). x, 352p. .
 Sidney D. Gamble, Chinese Village Plays from the Ting Hsien Region (Yang Ke Hsüan); a Collection of Forty-Eight Chinese Rural Plays as Staged by Villagers from Ting Hsien in Northern China  (Amsterdam,: APA-Philo Press,  1970). xxix, 762 p.p.  ; . Translated from the Chinese by various scholars after the original recordings and edited with a critical introd. and explanatory notes by Sidney D. Gamble.

Later publications, exhibits

 China Between Revolutions: Photographs by Sidney D. Gamble, 1917-1927 (Sidney D. Gamble Foundation  )Introduction by Jonathan D Spence, May Wu, Editor. 
 Sidney D. Gamble's China, 1917-1932: Photographs of the Land and Its People''  (Washington, D.C.: Alvin Rosenbaum Projects, Inc.,  1988). 191 pp.  forewords by John Hersey and L. Carrington Goodrich; introduction by Jonathan D. Spence.

External links
 
 —Gamble's 1920s film of pilgrimage to Miaofengshan, now housed at Duke University Libraries.
 Sidney D. Gamble Photographs Collection on Duke University Libraries: The site currently features photographs dated between 1908 and 1932.

American expatriates in China
Photography in China
Princeton University alumni
History of Christianity in China
1890 births
1968 deaths
University of California, Berkeley alumni
YMCA leaders